Emblas hemlighet ("Secret of Embla") is a Swedish TV series which was broadcast first during the summer of 2006, by the 2006 "Sommarlovsmorgon" Hej hej sommar.

Plot
The siblings Minda (17) and Viktor (15) have finished school with excellent grades and now their summer holiday has started. Minda'll go to Brighton for studying English-language and Viktor'll go to a camp for young researchers, but their vacations are cancelled this summer when their parents are kidnapped and they must live together with their aunt Marit on her boat Embla.

Marit is searching for a treasure; Mjölnir (Thor's Hammer), which the kidnappers, a gang called "Dirty Herrings", also want to find. Minda, Viktor and Marit work together for getting the hammer and the parents. In a diary, which was in a new-found kist from the bottom of the sea, "skeppsgossen" ("The Cabin boy") has written that he wrote 3 letters to his 3 brothers and the diary and the letters may help them finding the hammer.

Selected cast
Ida Linnertorp as Minda
Karl Linnertorp as Viktor
Petra Brylander as Marit
Isidor Torkar as Jean-Claude
Robert Jelinek as Roger, chief of "Dirty Herrings"
Hans-Christian Thulin as Snoken, member of "Dirty Herrings"

References

External links
Internet Movie Database 

Swedish children's television series
2006 Swedish television series debuts
2006 Swedish television series endings